"Dooset Daram" is a single by Iranian singer Arash, which was released in 2018 by Warner Music. It features Swedish Singer Helena.

Track listing

Charts

Weekly charts

Monthly charts

Year-end charts

References

2018 songs
Arash (singer) songs
Songs written by Robert Uhlmann (composer)
Songs written by Arash (singer)